Chris Prynoski (born November 1, 1971) is an American film and television producer, animator, and director, known for his work on TV programs such as Downtown, Metalocalypse, Freaknik: The Musical, Motorcity and Megas XLR and films such as Beavis and Butt-Head Do America.

Early life
Prynoski was born in Trenton, New Jersey and grew up in Bordentown, New Jersey. He attended local public schools in Bordentown and then Notre Dame High School, and remembers doodling constantly in class. After high school, he pursued art school and graduated from the School of Visual Arts in 1994.

Career
Prynoski began his career working in New York City, mostly on his own or through MTV's in-house studio on shows like Daria and Beavis and Butt-Head. He also created his own show, Downtown, which was nominated for a primetime Emmy Award in 2000. His directorial work in the hallucination sequence of Beavis and Butt-Head Do America was nominated for "Best Animated Sequence in a Feature Film" by the National Cartoonists Society.

In the same year, he moved to Hollywood, California, where he opened his own studio Titmouse, Inc. with wife, Shannon Prynoski.

Prynoski's animation can be seen in opening title sequences for The Osbournes and The Simple Life and his directorial work can be seen in a number of media, from commercials to feature films to television. He has directed animation for the animated commercial "Foot Long Hot Dog Inventor" for Budweiser, many music videos for artists including Velvet Revolver, Snoop Dogg and George Clinton, and among other projects, a Dexter's Lab spoof with They Might Be Giants for Cartoon Network. His directing credits also include The Amazing Screw-On Head starring Paul Giamatti, Megas XLR for Cartoon Network, Happy Monster Band for Disney, Metalocalypse for Cartoon Network, Motorcity for Disney XD, and Downtown for MTV.

Prynoski has also directed Adult Swim's Freaknik: The Musical and executive produced Black Panther for Marvel and G.I. Joe: Resolute for Hasbro. He created and executive produced of the animated series Motorcity, which premiered on Disney XD in April 2012. He directed the 2016 animated film Nerdland.

His animation studio, Titmouse, Inc., is best known for their work on the Guitar Hero game cinematics, the short film Scott Pilgrim vs. The Animation, and television series work on such shows as Metalocalypse, Avatar: The Last Airbender, Big Mouth, Afro Samurai, DJ & the Fro, Community, The Venture Bros., Freaknik: The Musical, and Superjail!.

He is an executive producer of the Amazon animated series The Legend of Vox Machina.

References

External links

1971 births
Living people
American animators
American animated film directors
American animated film producers
Notre Dame High School (New Jersey) alumni
People from Bordentown, New Jersey
Artists from Trenton, New Jersey
School of Visual Arts alumni